Th-stopping is the realization of the dental fricatives  as stops—either dental or alveolar—which occurs in several dialects of English. In other accents, such as varieties of Caribbean English, Nigerian English, Liberian English, and older, rural, or working-class Irish English, such pairs are indeed merged. Variation between both dental and alveolar forms exists in much of the working-class English speech of North America and sometimes southern England. Th-stopping occurred in all continental Germanic languages, resulting in cognates such as German die for "the" and Bruder for "brother".

New York City English
The  variant has a weakish articulation. The  opposition may be lost, exceptionally in the environment of a following  (making three homophonous with tree), and in the case of the word with, (so that with a may rhyme with the non-rhotic pronunciation of "bitter-bidder"; with you may be , following the same yod-coalescence rule as hit you. These pronunciations are all stigmatized.

The  opposition seems to be lost more readily, though not as readily as the "Brooklynese" stereotype might lead one to believe. As in many other places, initial  is subject to assimilation or deletion in a range of environments in relatively informal and/or popular speech, e.g. who's there ; as in many other places, it is also subject to stopping there . But it would not be usual for southern to be pronounced identically with sudden or breathe with breed.

African American Vernacular English
Th-stopping is also reported for some other non-initial s, apparently particularly when preceded by a nasal and followed by a plosive, as keep your mouth closed. Stopping of initial , however, is frequent making then homophonous with den.

Frequency in other accents
Th-stopping is also commonly heard, specifically from speakers of working-class origins, in the American English dialects of the Inland North (for example, in Milwaukee, Chicago, Cleveland, Buffalo, and Scranton), the Upper Midwest (for example in the especially Fennoscandian-descended locals of Minnesota's Iron Range and Michigan's Upper Peninsula), and the Mid-Atlantic region (for example, in Philadelphia and Baltimore), It is also heard in a minority of speakers of England's Estuary dialect (for example, in London), but only in the case of word-initial . Many speakers of Philippine English and some speakers of other variants in Asia also have th-stopping.

However, a 1997 study in Sheffield found this was then largely confined to older males.

Homophonous pairs

See also
List of Th-stopping homophones
Th-fronting

References

English phonology
Splits and mergers in English phonology
English th